The Bothie of Toper-na-fuosich, subtitled "A Long-Vacation Pastoral" is a lengthy narrative poem by the Victorian poet Arthur Hugh Clough, which was critically well received at the time. The work was written in the summer of 1848.  The poem follows its main character, Philip, as he departs from his Oxford companions who are studying in the Scottish Highlands, to pursue a life filled with love and adventure.

References

External links

 

Victorian poetry
1848 poems